The Pinkees were an English power pop band from Basildon, Essex, England, active in the early 1980s. The band members were Paul Egholm (vocals, guitar), Andy Price (vocals, guitar), Max Reinsch (guitar, keyboards), Nevil Kiddier (bass) and Paul Reynolds (drums). Piano and additional vocals, when recording, were supplied by their producer Keith Bonsoir. They released four singles and an album on Creole Records from 1982–1983. Their second single, "Danger Games", reached No. 8 on the UK Singles Chart (although it was claimed to have achieved the feat through chart hyping, and did not appear on some other charts at all) and gained them appearances on BBC TV programmes such as Top of the Pops and Pebble Mill at One. The eponymously titled album was released on vinyl and cassette but it has never been issued in CD format.

Paul Egholm died in April 2017, after suffering from cancer.

Discography

Albums
1982: The Pinkees (Creole)

Singles
1982: "Gonna Be Lonely Again" / "I'm Feeling Lonely" (Creole)
1982: "Danger Games" / "Keep On Loving You" (Creole) - UK No. 8
1982: "Holding Me Tight" / "Girl in a Million" (Creole)
1983: "I'll Be There" / "Rocking with the Band" (Creole) - UK No. 87

References

English rock music groups
English power pop groups
English new wave musical groups
Musical groups from Essex